The AmEagle American Eaglet was a highly unorthodox ultralight sailplane marketed in the U.S. for homebuilding. It was a one-seat, high-wing braced monoplane that carried an inverted V-tail on a long boom extending from a pod-like fuselage.  Intended for self-launching, it was equipped with a McCulloch go-kart engine and a folding propeller behind the cabin.  Its first flight was on 19 November 1975, and by 1978, at least 250 sets of plans had been sold, with 12 aircraft reportedly completed.

Specifications

See also

References

 
 The Rigid Wing Web Site
 Gliding and Motorgliding International

Single-engined pusher aircraft
High-wing aircraft
1970s United States sailplanes
1970s United States ultralight aircraft
Homebuilt aircraft
V-tail aircraft
Motor gliders
Aircraft first flown in 1975